Leikanger may refer to:

Leikanger, a municipality in Sogn og Fjordane county, Norway
Leikanger (village), a village in Leikanger municipality in Sogn og Fjordane county, Norway
Leikanger, Selje, a village in Selje municipality in Sogn og Fjordane county, Norway
Leikanger Church, a church in Leikanger municipality in Sogn og Fjordane county, Norway
Leikanger Church (Herøy), a church in Herøy municipality in Møre og Romsdal county, Norway
Leikanger Church (Selje), a church in Selje municipality in Sogn og Fjordane county, Norway